Charles Solomon "Buddy" Myer (March 16, 1904 – October 31, 1974) was an American professional baseball player. He played in Major League Baseball as a second baseman from  through . A two-time All-Star, Myer was notable for being the  American League batting champion and led the American League in stolen bases in 1928. An excellent hitter, he batted .300 or better nine times, and retired with a career average of .303. Myer walked more than twice as many times as he struck out. Apart from a brief period with the Boston Red Sox in 1927–28, he spent his entire career with the Washington Senators.

Early life
Myer was born in Ellisville, Mississippi, the son of Maud (née Stevens) and Charles Solomon Myer, a merchant and cotton buyer. He was of German and English descent. His father's family was of Jewish descent but had converted in an earlier generation. During his lifetime, Myer was incorrectly reported to be Jewish.

Career

Myer decided to go to college at Mississippi A&M (now Mississippi State University). In 1923, he attracted many baseball scouts to watch him play.  That same year, the Washington Senators offered him a contract. Buddy accepted the contract with the one condition, that he finish his college education.  Myer graduated from Mississippi A&M in 1925.

He was discovered by baseball promoter, Joe Engel, who managed the Chattanooga Lookouts at Engel Stadium.

He broke in with the Senators in 1925 at the age of 21.  In 1926 he batted .304.  In May 1927 he was traded by the Senators to the Red Sox for Topper Rigney.

In 1928 he stole a career-high 30 bases for the Red Sox, leading the league, while batting .313, and was 5th in the league with 26 sacrifice hits.  He came in 9th in AL MVP voting.

After the season, the Senators got him back, but had to give up five ballplayers in trade.  In December 1928 the Red Sox traded him to the Senators for Milt Gaston, Hod Lisenbee, Bobby Reeves, Grant Gillis, and Elliot Bigelow.

In 1929 he batted .300, and the following year he batted .303 with an 8th-best 114 runs scored.  In 1932 he had a career-high 16 triples (2nd), and scored a career-high 120 runs (6th).  In 1933 he batted .302, and in 1934 he batted .305 with 102 walks (4th in the league) and a .419 on-base percentage (6th).

In 1935 he won the American League batting title with a .349 mark.  He had 215 hits (2nd in the league), a .440 on-base percentage and 96 walks (4th), played in 151 games (5th), scored 115 runs (7th), and had 100 RBIs.  He was voted to the All Star team, and came in 4th in MVP voting that year.

In 1933, Myer was involved in what many still consider to be baseball's most violent brawl, between him and the Yankees' Ben Chapman.  It is alleged that Chapman – who later gained great infamy for his taunting of Jackie Robinson in 1947, while Chapman was the manager of the Phillies – not only spiked Myer, but hurled a number of anti-semitic epithets at him. Chapman and Myer's fight spread to the dugouts and the stands.  Long suspensions for all involved followed.

In 1937 he was selected for the All-Star Game, and ended the year with a .407 OBP (9th in the league).

In 1938 he had another outstanding season, finishing 4th in the league with a .336 batting average, 2nd in OBP with .454 , and 7th in walks with 93.  In 1939 he batted .302 in a partial season, his 9th and final time eclipsing the .300 mark.

He died at age 70 in Baton Rouge, Louisiana.

In a 1976 Esquire magazine article, sportswriter Harry Stein published an "All Time All-Star Argument Starter", consisting of five ethnic baseball teams. Myer was the shortstop on Stein's Jewish team. Baseball historian Bill James reported that Myer "told a home-town newspaperman shortly before his death in 1974 that he was not Jewish, he was German", and that he "never set the record straight". Despite this late-life denial, the truth appears to be that while Myer's father of the same name, Charles Solomon Myer, was of Jewish origin, his mother Maud was not. Thus, Myer was ethnically only half-Jewish, and was not raised in the faith.

Career statistics

See also

 List of Major League Baseball career hits leaders
 List of Major League Baseball career triples leaders
 List of Major League Baseball career runs scored leaders
 List of Major League Baseball batting champions
 List of Major League Baseball annual stolen base leaders
 List of Major League Baseball career stolen bases leaders

References

External links

Baseball Cube stats
Fangraphs stats

1904 births
1974 deaths
American League All-Stars
American League stolen base champions
Baseball players from Mississippi
Boston Red Sox players
Major League Baseball second basemen
Mississippi State Bulldogs baseball players
New Orleans Pelicans (baseball) players
Washington Senators (1901–1960) players
People from Ellisville, Mississippi